Veronica Burton (born 27 January 1952) is a British former professional tennis player.

Specialising on clay, Veronica remains the last British player to beat Martina Navratilova in a Grand Slam tournament in the 1973 U.S. Open - Women's Singles.

External links
 
 

1952 births
Living people
English female tennis players
French Open junior champions
Tennis people from Greater London
Grand Slam (tennis) champions in girls' singles
British female tennis players